Greetings from Tucson is an American sitcom television series created by Peter Murrieta, which aired on The WB from September 20, 2002 to May 9, 2003, during the 2002-2003 season. The series was executive produced by Rob LaZebnik, Peter Murrieta, Howard Klein and David Miner.

Though reviews were mixed, critics applauded the abilities of the mostly-Latino cast, calling the show "a welcome addition to TV's largely white landscape,"  and compared its premise to I Love Lucy, The Jeffersons and the thought-provoking 1970s comedies of Norman Lear.

Overview
Greetings from Tucson focused on the Tiant family, through the eyes of 15-year-old son David. His father Joaquin was a proud, pragmatic Mexican-American; mother Elizabeth is a feisty, no-nonsense white woman of Irish descent; and older sister Maria is a popular cheerleader. Also around were Joaquin's irresponsible brother Ernesto; Ernesto's son Daniel; Joaquin's mother Magdalena; and David's friend and new neighbor Sarah Tobin.

The series begins six months after Joaquin's promotion at the local copper mine enabled him to move the family to a better neighborhood. Based on the life of series creator Peter Murrieta, the series attempted to examine the themes of cultural identity, family and class. The family's former neighborhood was mentioned to be an impoverished area, where the family home had bars on the windows and was subject to frequent police helicopter flyovers. Stereotypes of Mexican-American culture are lampooned in the series, and used self-deprecatingly.

The show's title was meant to imitate the caption of a postcard, and the title sequence displayed the cast and credits on a series of postcards. The same visual device was used to transition between scenes.  The exterior shot of the daughter's apartment building is a photograph of a real Tucson apartment complex, Casa Royale. The show's theme song was performed by Los Lobos.

Cast
 Julio Oscar Mechoso as Joaquin Tiant
 Rebecca Creskoff as Elizabeth Tiant
 Jacob Vargas as Ernesto Tiant
 Pablo Santos as David Tiant
 Aimee Garcia as Maria Tiant
 Sara Paxton  as Sarah Tobin
 Lupe Ontiveros as Magdalena Tiant
 Bobby Chavez as Daniel Tiant

Recurring
 Molly Hagan as Karen Tobin
 James Widdoes as Don Tobin

Notable Guest Stars
 J.C. Chasez as Jay Dugray
 Carmen Electra as Rosa
 Teri Garr as Helen
 Willie Garson as Mr. Gargan
 Ana Ortiz as Angela
 Martin Mull as Tom
 Joe Regalbuto as Mr. Klein
 Brian Scolaro as Larry Janetti
 Vince Neil as himself

Episodes

References

 Review by Steve Lutz, TeeVee.org, October 15, 2002

External links
 
 

2000s American sitcoms
2002 American television series debuts
2003 American television series endings
Culture of Tucson, Arizona
English-language television shows
Television series about families
Television series by CBS Studios
Television shows set in Tucson, Arizona
The WB original programming
Latino sitcoms